Kings Weston Roman Villa is a Roman villa in Lawrence Weston in the north-west of Bristol. The villa was discovered during the construction of the Lawrence Weston housing estate in 1947.  Two distinct buildings (Eastern and Western) were discovered. The Eastern building was fully excavated (in 1948–50), the other lies mostly below Long Cross road.  Finds from the site are now held in the Bristol City Museum and Art Gallery.

At Kings Weston Roman Villa visitors can see the only Roman bath suite in Bristol and two original 3rd-century mosaic floors as well as discover Roman central heating. The villa is open for public for special events and on open days. At other times visitors can collect a key from Blaise Castle or Bristol City Museum and Art Gallery.

History

George C. Boon and John Clevedon Brown conducted the excavations of the Eastern building. Injuries to the skull and shoulder suggested that he had died violently. Coins of the Valentinian and Gratian periods led to a conclusion that the man may have died in a Viking raid in the latter part of the fourth or early fifth century AD.

Two other bodies were found in the vicinity. Traces of decorated walls, mosaic floors, underfloor heating and bath suites were discovered.  Based on the dating of coins and other evidence such as a foundation burial of a young pig, it was suggested that the site had been occupied since the third century AD.  The layout of the building, dominated by a large hall, relatively common in Britain and Germany, led to the hypotheses by archaeologist J. T. Smith that this type of building was used by an extended family group rather than a nuclear family.

Notes

External links

 Bristol Museums: Kings Weston Roman Villa
 Detailed historic record for Kings Weston Roman Villa

Roman villas in Gloucestershire
Tourist attractions in Bristol
Museums in Bristol
Archaeological sites in Bristol
Museums of ancient Rome in the United Kingdom
Scheduled monuments in Bristol